Atalay is a Turkish name and surname. Notable people with the surname include:

Given name
 Atalay Filiz, Turkish serial murder suspect

Surname
 Beşir Atalay (born 1947), Turkish politician
 Buket Atalay (born 1990), Turkish female Paralympian goalball player
 Bülent Atalay, Turkish-American author
 Erdoğan Atalay (born 1966), Turkish-German actor
 Mahmut Atalay (1934-2004), Turkish sport wrestler
 Pinar Atalay (born 1978), German radio and television presenter

Turkish-language surnames